Mary Jacqueline Peña Carruitero (born 17 November 1963) is a Peruvian educator who served as First Lady of Peru from 10 November 2020 to 15 November of the same year.

References 

Living people
1963 births
First Ladies of Peru
Peruvian educators